Joseph Williams may refer to:

Music
 Joseph Williams (composer) (1800–1834), English composer
 Joseph Williams (music publisher), London music publisher
 Joseph Williams (musician) (born 1960), rock singer with band Toto

Politics
 Joe Williams (Cook Islands politician) (1934–2020)
 Joseph Williams (Connecticut politician) (1779–1865)
 Joseph R. Williams (1808–1861), Michigan politician and college president
 Joseph Lanier Williams (1810–1865), U.S. Representative from Tennessee
 Joseph H. Williams (1814–1896), governor of Maine
 Joseph T. Williams (1842–1910), American politician in Nevada
 Joseph Powell Williams (1840–1904), English Liberal and Liberal Unionist politician
 J. J. Williams Jr. (1905–1968), Virginia legislator and segregationalist

Religion 
 Joseph A. Williams (born 1974), Catholic auxiliary bishop-elect of Saint Paul and Minneapolis
 Joseph W. Williams (1857–1934), Anglican bishop of St John's, South Africa

Sports
 Joseph Williams (athlete) (1897–?), British Olympic athlete
 Joseph Williams (Nevisian cricketer) (born 1989)
 Joseph Williams (English cricketer) (1892–1916)
 Joseph Williams (Barbadian cricketer) (born 1974)
 Joseph Williams (footballer) (1857–?), Welsh international footballer

Other
 Joseph Williams (justice) (1801–1870), Chief Justice of the Iowa Supreme Court
 Joseph D. Williams (1818–?), Adjutant General of the State of Connecticut
 Joseph P. Williams (1915–2003), creator of the BankAmericard
 Joseph M. Williams (1933–2008), professor of English
 Joseph Williams (actor), English stage actor

See also
 Joe Williams (disambiguation)